Aftab Hussain (born 17 November 1997) is a Hong Kong cricketer. In November 2019, he was named in Hong Kong's squad for the 2019 ACC Emerging Teams Asia Cup in Bangladesh. He made his List A debut for Hong Kong, against Bangladesh, in the Emerging Teams Cup on 14 November 2019. Later the same month, he was named in Hong Kong's squad for the Cricket World Cup Challenge League B tournament in Oman.

In February 2020, he was named in Hong Kong's Twenty20 International (T20I) squad for the 2020 Interport T20I Series against Malaysia. He made his T20I debut for Hong Kong, against Malaysia, on 20 February 2020.

References

External links
 

1997 births
Living people
Hong Kong cricketers
Hong Kong Twenty20 International cricketers
Place of birth missing (living people)